Fuat Buruk (born 23 February 1965 in Istanbul) is a Turkish football assistant manager for Osmanlıspor, and retired footballer who played as a midfielder for Konyaspor, Bakırköyspor, İstanbulspor A.Ş. in the Turkish Süper Lig.

Professional career
Fuat spent his career in the top divisions of Turkey. After his long tenure with İstanbulspor A.Ş., Fuat returned to coach the youth team, and since then has been an assistant manager for various Süper Lig clubs. He has consistently been the assistant manager of Hamza Hamzaoğlu since 2008, where they were part of the management team of Yeni Malatyaspor.

Personal life
Fuat is the brother of the footballer Okan Buruk.

References

External links
 
  (as coach)
 

1965 births
Living people
Footballers from Istanbul
Turkish footballers
Konyaspor footballers
Bakırköyspor footballers
İstanbulspor footballers
Adanaspor footballers
Süper Lig players
TFF First League players
Association football midfielders